Lymington Station may refer to

Lymington Town railway station
Lymington Pier railway station